This is a list of cities and towns in the South Island of New Zealand by the population of their urban area.

The populations given in the table below are provisional New Zealand usually resident populations,  estimates, and refer to the urban area defined under the Statistical Standard for Geographic Areas 2018 (SSGA) unless otherwise stated.

Cities

Towns

Population 10,000 and over

† Timaru was officially a city until local government reorganisation in 1989, and is still frequently referred to as such.

Population 1,000 to 9,999

Major suburbs
The following suburbs have a population of over 2,000.

Christchurch

Dunedin

‡ Mosgiel, Port Chalmers, and Green Island were officially separate towns until local government reorganisation in 1989, and are separated from Dunedin's main urban area. They are still frequently referred to as towns.

Invercargill

Nelson

Others

Map

See also 
List of cities and towns in the South Island

South Island
Cities And Towns in the South Island By Population